The 2012 Hastings Borough Council election was held on Thursday 3 May 2012 to elect members of Hastings Borough Council in East Sussex, England. Half of the council was up for election, and Labour remained in overall control of the council. Overall turnout  was 30.9%, a significant reduction compared to the previous results in 2010, when the elections were held alongside a parliamentary general election.

After the election, the composition of the council was:
Labour 23 (+6 compared to 2010)
Conservative 9 (-5)
Liberal Democrat 0 (-1)

Election result

Ward results

References

2012 English local elections
2012
2010s in East Sussex